The Mesopotamian chub (Squalius berak) is a cyprinid fish found in the Qweik and Euphrates and Tigris drainages.

References

Squalius
Fish described in 1843